Ernesto Zanzi (born 9 July 1904, date of death unknown) was an Italian racing cyclist. He rode in the 1932 Tour de France.

References

External links
 

1904 births
Year of death missing
Italian male cyclists
Place of birth missing
Cyclists from the Province of Varese